"" (literally: Awake, the voice is calling us) is a Lutheran hymn written in German by Philipp Nicolai, first published in 1599 together with "". It appears in German hymnals and in several English hymnals in translations such as "Wake, Awake, for Night Is Flying" (Catherine Winkworth, 1858), "Wake, O wake! with tidings thrilling" (Francis Crawford Burkitt, 1906), and "Up! Awake! From Highest Steeple" (George Ratcliffe Woodward, 1908). Johann Sebastian Bach based a chorale cantata on the hymn, one of its many musical settings.

Nicolai 

Philipp Nicolai wrote the hymn in 1598, a time when the plague had hit Unna where he lived for six months as a preacher after studies in theology at the University of Wittenberg. The text is based on the Parable of the Ten Virgins. Nicolai refers to other biblical ideas, such as from Revelations the mentioning of marriage and the twelve gates, every one of pearl, and from the First Epistle to the Corinthians the phrase "eye hath not seen, nor ear heard".

In 1599 Nicolai published both the hymn tune, Zahn No. 8405a, and the words to the hymn. Portions of the melody are similar to the older hymn tune "In dulci jubilo" ("In sweet rejoicing") and to "" ("Silver Air") by Hans Sachs.

The author wrote in his preface, dated 10 August 1598:

Nicolai's former student, had died of the plague at the age of fourteen, and Nicolai used the initials of "Graf zu Waldeck" in reverse order as an acrostic to begin the three stanzas: "Wachet auf", "Zion hört die Wächter singen", "Gloria sei dir gesungen".

Musical settings 
Dieterich Buxtehude composed two cantatas based on the hymn, BuxWV 100 and BuxWV 101. Johann Sebastian Bach based his chorale cantata , on the hymn and derived one of the Schübler Chorales, BWV 645, from the cantata's central movement. His son Johann Christoph Friedrich Bach wrote a cantata for a four-part choir, . In Felix Mendelssohn's St. Paul oratorio, Wachet auf features prominently as a chorale and also as the main theme of the overture.

In 1900, Max Reger composed a fantasia for organ on "" as the second of Three chorale fantasias, Op. 52. He composed a chorale prelude as No. 41 of his 52 chorale preludes, Op. 67 in 1902. Herbert Blendinger also wrote a chorale fantasia on the hymn, Op. 49.

Hugo Distler composed an organ partita based on the hymn in 1935 (Op. 8/2).

The following example is the final movement of Bach's cantata, a four-part setting of the final stanza:

In English 

Hymnologist John Julian, in his 1907 Dictionary of Hymnology, listed sixteen English translations of this hymn, ten of which were then in common use. The following year, Duncan Campbell reported that "the favourite rendering" was either that of Catherine Winkworth or the one compiled by William Cooke. Both of these translations are titled "Wake, Awake, for Night is Flying"; Cooke's translation is based on Winkworth's and other translations, with additions by Cooke himself.

References

Further reading 
 Christian Möllers (ed.): Kirchenlied und Gesangbuch. Quellen zur Geschichte. A. Francke Verlag, Tübingen 2000, pp. 148–149.
 Barbara Stühlmeyer, Ludger Stühlmeyer: Wachsam – Achtsam. Wachet auf ruft uns die Stimme. In: Das Leben singen. Christliche Lieder und ihr Ursprung. Verlag DeBehr, Radeberg 2011, pp. 11–18, .

External links 

 
 
 
 Wachet auf, ruft uns die Stimme cpdl.org
 Text & Musik: 1599. cyberhymnal.org
 Frewden Spiegel deß ewigen Lebens, Frankfurt 1599, p. 412f.
 J. S. Bach's chorale prelude BWV 645, played by E. Power Biggs in 1968

16th-century hymns in German
Lutheran hymns
Hymn tunes
Advent songs
1597 works